Háaleiti og Bústaðir is a district of Reykjavík, the capital of Iceland. Within the district are four neighbourhoods: Háaleiti proper, Kringla , Gerði  and Fossvogur .

External links

Districts of Reykjavík